The 2019 South and Central American Men's Junior Handball Championship was the first edition of the tournament, took place in Palmira, Colombia at the Pabellon Blanco, from 3 to 7 April 2019. It acted as the South and Central American qualifying tournament for the 2019 Men's Junior World Handball Championship.

Standings

Results
All times are local (UTC–5).

References

External links
Colombian Handball Federation website

South and Central American Men's Junior Handball Championship
South and Central American Men's Junior Handball Championship
South and Central American Men's Junior Handball Championship
International handball competitions hosted by Brazil
South and Central American Men's Youth Handball Championship
Taubaté